The Communauté de communes du Canton de Forges-les-Eaux was located in the Seine-Maritime département of the Normandy region of northern France. It was created in December 2001. It was merged into the new Communauté de communes des 4 rivières in January 2017.

Participants 
The Communauté de communes comprised the following communes:

Beaubec-la-Rosière
Beaussault
La Bellière
Compainville
La Ferté-Saint-Samson
Forges-les-Eaux
Gaillefontaine
Grumesnil
Haucourt
Haussez
Longmesnil
Mauquenchy
Mesnil-Mauger
Pommereux
Roncherolles-en-Bray
Rouvray-Catillon
Saint-Michel-d'Halescourt
Saumont-la-Poterie
Serqueux
Le Thil-Riberpré

See also
Communes of the Seine-Maritime department

References 

Forges-les-Eaux